Rectifi was an online search engine which channeled profits it earned to charity.

Rectifi was set up by Jonny Platt as a successor to GiveAsYouGet.  As well as a general search engine with sponsored adds, rectifi  earns revenue through eBay, and a comparison shopping feature.  The site also provides information on how to reduce pollution and make a difference to poverty in the developing world at home.

The charities that benefit are picked on a quarterly basis, and have included Voluntary Service Overseas, World Development Movement and Greenpeace.  Platt has appeared on the BBC's "Click Online" programme to help publicise the site.

References

External links
 Rectifi Homepage

Non-profit organisations based in England
Internet search engines